Stonehenge is a town in northwest Jamaica.

Namesake 
There is another town in Jamaica with the same name.

Transport 
It was served by a railway station on the national railway system.

Education 
Orange Hill All Age School is just west of the crossroad. As of 2010 the school has three teachers and about 70 students.

See also 
 Railway stations in Jamaica

References 

Populated places in Jamaica